Jeong Seok-Min  (born 27 January 1988) is a South Korean footballer who plays as a midfielder for the Penang FA in the Malaysia Super League

Club career

Jeong was one of the Pohang Steelers' draft picks for the 2010 K-League season. He made his debut for the Steelers in a league match against FC Seoul on 27 March 2010, and scored his first professional goal in the Steeler's loss to Jeju United on 8 May 2010.  Jeong remains with Pohang for the 2011 K-League season.

On 9 January 2012, Jeong moved from Pohang to Jeju United. He currently plays with Penang FA.

Club career statistics

References

External links 

Categoroy:Jeonnam Dragons players

1988 births
Living people
Association football goalkeepers
South Korean footballers
Pohang Steelers players
Jeju United FC players
Daejeon Hana Citizen FC players
K League 1 players
K League 2 players
Association football midfielders